Thomas Cadwallader Zimmerman (January 23, 1838 – November 13, 1914) was a Pennsylvania German writer and translator, notable for his translations of English language classics into the Pennsylvania German dialect. He was also the editor of the Reading Times newspaper in Reading, Berks County, Pennsylvania.

Life and career
Zimmerman was born in Lebanon County, Pennsylvania in the United States in 1838.  There he attended public school until he was thirteen years old, and was apprenticed as a printer with the Lebanon Courier.  Upon completion of his apprenticeship, he went to Philadelphia to work at The Philadelphia Inquirer.  In 1856, he became a journeyman printer with the Berks and Schuylkill Journal.  He relocated to Columbia, South Carolina in 1859, and returned to the Reading area at the outset of the American Civil War, where in 1863 he enlisted in Company C of the 42nd Regiment of Pennsylvania Volunteers.  Although he is sometimes referred to as "Colonel," he saw no active service during the war.  On June 11, 1867 he married Tamsie T. Kauffman of Reading.  By 1897, he was the president of the Reading Times Publishing Company and editor of the Reading Times newspaper.  In 1903, a volume titled Olla Podrida was published of his translations.  In 1904, he was awarded a Doctor of Humane Letters degree from Muhlenberg College in Allentown, Pennsylvania.  Zimmerman retired from his newspaper career in October, 1908.

Zimmerman was quite active in public life.  He was trustee of the Board of the State Asylum at Wernersville, director of the Reading Free Public Library, president of the Pennsylvania Association of Superintendents and Trustees of Insane Asylums and vice-president of the Pennsylvania Chautauqua Association.  He was one of the founders of the Pennsylvania German Society, and of the Historical Society of Berks County.

Zimmerman died in Reading, Pennsylvania in 1914.

Translations
Zimmerman specialized in the translation of German poetry into English and of English language classics into the Pennsylvania German dialect, which, during his lifetime, was spoken by a significant percentage of the population in the area where he lived and worked.  Because of his association with the Reading Times, in which his translations were regularly published, he was able to reach a large number of readers in the Berks County region.

His most notable translations included Clement C. Moores' "Twas the Night Before Christmas", Martin Luther's "Ein feste Burg ist unser Gott" ("A Mighty Fortress Is Our God)" and Friedrich Schiller's "Die Glocke" ("Song of the Bell").

Publications
Olla Podrida (1903)

References

Notes

1838 births
1914 deaths
American poets in Pennsylvania Dutch
American writers in Pennsylvania Dutch
People from Lebanon County, Pennsylvania
Pennsylvania culture
American male journalists
Pennsylvania Dutch people
People from Berks County, Pennsylvania
Print editors
Pennsylvania Dutch culture
Pennsylvania Dutch language
English–German translators
American people of German descent
19th-century translators
19th-century American male writers
Journalists from Pennsylvania